William Camac Wilkinson (15 September 1857 – 2 February 1946) was an Australian born first-class cricketer active 1881–99 who played twice for Middlesex in 1881 and 1882. He played four times for the Australian tour of 1878. He was born in Sydney, studied in Australia and London, England, becoming a noted physician and lecturer, and died in Virginia Water, Surrey, England. He played in eight first-class matches as a right-handed batsman, scoring 189 runs with a highest score of 52; as a right-arm medium pace bowler, taking eight wickets with a best performance of four for 49.

Professional life
He was a physician in Sydney becoming lecturer in pathology (1884–1901) then medicine (1901–1910) at the University of Sydney before moving to London, where he became a Harley Street specialist in 1910. He was a Fellow of the Royal College of Physicians. He was a leading specialist in the treatment of tuberculosis.

Publications
W. Camac Wilkinson, The Role of the City Dispensary in the Crusade Against Consumption. Sydney, W.C. Penfold. 1904
W. Camac Wilkinson, Treatment of Consumption, Macmillan & Co. 1908
W. Camac Wilkinson, Diagnosis and Treatment of Tuberculosis (Weber Parkes Prize Essay) with additions. London, James Nisbet & Co. 1912

Family
Wilkinson was the eldest of seven children of London born barrister and judge William Hattam Wilkinson (15 February 1831 – 25 September 1908) and Elizabeth Sibyl Milligan (20 November 1828 – 7 January 1902) who emigrated to Australia in the year of their marriage, 1852. Wilkinson and his siblings were born in Sydney, New South Wales, Australia. Wilkinson's three brothers, Henry Lane Wilkinson, Frederick Bushby Wilkinson and Edward Western Wilkinson all became solicitors. Frederick Bushby Wilkinson assisted their father in editing the 1894 edition of The Australian Magistrate in 1894 which Wilkinson's father had begun editing from 1860 as Plunkett's Australian Magistrate.
Wilkinson's son Alexander Wilkinson was a decorated soldier and also first-class cricketer.

References

1857 births
1946 deaths
English cricketers
Middlesex cricketers
Marylebone Cricket Club cricketers
Gentlemen of England cricketers
Sydney Medical School alumni
Alumni of the UCL Medical School
Australian pulmonologists
20th-century English medical doctors
Medical doctors from Sydney
Cricketers from Sydney
A. J. Webbe's XI cricketers